Britannia Park (Hebrew: Park Britannia, פארק בריטניה) is a forest and recreation area in Israel, in the Judean lowland.

The forest was planted by the Jewish National Fund starting in the 1950s, and with the financial aid of British Jews, after whom the park was named.

See also
List of forests in Israel
Hiking in Israel

References
 

Protected areas of Israel
Forests of Israel